Trade Unions play a major role in the corporatist Dutch economy.

Dynamics 
In 2001 about 25% of the Dutch people who were employed were organized in a union. There are three major unions: the Christian-democratic "Christelijk Nationaal Vakverbond (CNV)", the social-democratically oriented "Federatie Nederlandse Vakbeweging (FNV)" and the "Federation of Managerial and Professional Staff Unions (MHP)". All are federations of sector-based labour unions. The FNV is with about 1,4 million members the largest of the three. The CNV has 350.000 members and the MHP 160.000. The FNV has 17 affiliate unions, the CNV 11 and the MHP 4. 

The labour unions play a major role in the Dutch economy because, first, they bargain with employers' organizations over wages and working conditions (these deals are binding for all employed people), and second, they advise the government on economic legislation through its membership of the Social-Economic Council (SER).

Traditionally Dutch labour unions were part of the pillarized structure of society. Each social group had a pillar: the Protestants (CNV), the Catholics (NKV, merged into FNV), the social-democrats (NVV, merged into FNV) and the syndicalists (NAS).

References